A number of states and armed groups have involved themselves in the ongoing Syrian Civil War as belligerents.

Syrian Arab Republic and allies

A number of sources have emphasized that as of at least late-2015/early-2016 the Syrian Arab Republic was dependent on a mix of volunteers and militias, rather than the Syrian Armed Forces.

Syrian Armed Forces

Before the uprising and war broke out, the Syrian Armed Forces were estimated at 325,000 regular troops and 280,000–300,000 reservists. Of the regular troops, 220,000 were 'army troops' and the rest in the navy, air force and air defense force. Following defections as early as June 2011, the Syrian Observatory for Human Rights estimated that by July 2012, tens of thousands of soldiers had defected.

National Defense Force

The Syrian NDF was formed out of pro-government militias. They receive their salaries and military equipment from the government, and in 2013 numbered around 100,000 troops. The force acts in an infantry role, directly fighting against rebels on the ground and running counter-insurgency operations in coordination with the army, who provides them with logistical and artillery support. The force has a 500-strong women's wing called "Lionesses of National Defense" which operates checkpoints. NDF members, like regular army soldiers, are allowed to loot the battlefields (but only if they participate in raids with the army), and can sell the loot for extra money. Sensing that they depend on the largely secular government, many of the militias of Syrian Christians (like Sootoro in Al-Hasakah) fight on the Baathist Syrian government's side and seek to defend their ancient towns, villages and farmsteads from ISIL (see also Christian Militias in Syria).

Shabiha

The Shabiha are unofficial pro-government militias drawn largely from Syria's Alawite minority group. Since the uprising, the Baathist Syrian government has been accused of using shabiha to break up protests and enforce laws in restive neighborhoods. As the protests escalated into an armed conflict, the opposition started using the term shabiha to describe civilians they suspected of supporting Bashar al-Assad and the Syrian government and clashing with pro-opposition demonstrators. The opposition blames the shabiha for the many violent excesses committed against anti-government protesters and opposition sympathizers, as well as looting and destruction. In December 2012, the shabiha were designated a terrorist organization by the United States.

Bassel al-Assad is reported to have created the shabiha in the 1980s for government use in times of crisis. Shabiha have been described as "a notorious Alawite paramilitary, who are accused of acting as unofficial enforcers for Assad's government"; "gunmen loyal to Assad", and, according to the Qatar-based Arab Center for Research and Policy Studies, "semi-criminal gangs  thugs close to the government". Despite the group's image as an Alawite militia, some shabiha operating in Aleppo have been reported to be Sunnis. In 2012, the Assad government created a more organized official militia known as the Jaysh al-Sha'bi, allegedly with help from Iran and Hezbollah. As with the shabiha, the vast majority of Jaysh al-Sha'bi members are Alawite and Shi'ite volunteers.

Hezbollah

In February 2013, former secretary general of Hezbollah, Sheikh Subhi al-Tufayli, confirmed that Hezbollah was fighting for the Syrian Army, which in October 2012, General Secretary Hassan Nasrallah had still denied was happening on a large scale, except to admit that Hezbollah fighters helped the Assad government "retain control of some 23 strategically located villages [in Syria] inhabited by Shiites of Lebanese citizenship". Nasrallah said that Hezbollah fighters have died in Syria doing their "jihadist duties".

In 2012 and 2013, Hezbollah was active in gaining control of territory in the Al-Qusayr District of Syria, by May 2013 publicly collaborating with the Syrian Army and taking 60 percent of Qusayr by the end of 14 May. In Lebanon, there have been "a recent increase in the funerals of Hezbollah fighters" and "Syrian rebels have shelled Hezbollah-controlled areas." As of 14 May 2013, Hezbollah fighters were reported to be fighting alongside the Syrian Army, particularly in the Homs Governorate. Hassan Nasrallah has called on Shiites and Hezbollah to protect the shrine of Sayida Zeinab. President Bashar al-Assad denied in May 2013 that there were foreign fighters, Arab or otherwise, fighting for the government in Syria.

On 25 May 2013, Nasrallah announced that Hezbollah was fighting in Syria against Islamic extremists and "pledged that his group will not allow Syrian militants to control areas that border Lebanon". In the televised address, he said, "If Syria falls in the hands of America, Israel and the takfiris, the people of our region will go into a dark period." According to independent analysts, by the beginning of 2014, approximately 500 Hezbollah fighters had died in the Syrian conflict. On 7 February 2016, 50 Hezbollah fighters were killed in a clash by the Jaysh al-Islam near Damascus. These fighters were embedded in the Syrian Army (SAA) formation called Army Division 39.

Iran

Iran continues to officially deny the presence of its combat troops in Syria, maintaining that it provides military advice to Assad's forces in their fight against terrorist groups. Since the civil uprising phase of the Syrian civil war, Iran has provided the Syrian Arab Republic with financial, technical, and military support, including training and some combat troops. Iran and Syria are close strategic allies. Iran sees the survival of the Assad government as being crucial to its regional interests. Iran's supreme leader, Ali Khamenei, was reported to be vocally in favor of the Baathist government.

By December 2013 Iran was thought to have approximately 10,000 operatives in Syria. But according to Jubin Goodarzi, assistant professor and researcher at Webster University, Iran aided Baathist Syria with a limited number of deployed units and personnel, "at most in the hundreds ... and not in the thousands as opposition sources claimed". Lebanese Hezbollah fighters backed by Tehran have taken direct combat roles since 2012. In the summer of 2013, Iran and Hezbollah provided important battlefield support for Syrian forces, allowing them to make advances on the opposition. In 2014, coinciding with the peace talks at Geneva II, Iran has stepped up support for Syrian President Assad. The Syrian Minister of Finance and Economy stated more than 15 billion dollars had come from the Iranian government. Prior to his assassination, Islamic Revolutionary Guard Corps's Quds Force commander Qasem Soleimani was in charge of Syrian President Assad's security portfolio and oversaw the arming and training of thousands of pro-government Shi'ite fighters.

By 2015, 328 IRGC troops, including several commanders, had reportedly been killed in the Syrian civil war since it began.

On 6 March 2020, Farhad Dabirian, a commander in IRGC, was killed in Syria. He was previously stationed at Palmyra in Syria.

Foreign Shia militias

Shia fighters from Afghanistan and Pakistan are "far more numerous" than Sunni non-Syrian fighters, though they have received "noticeably less attention" from the media. The number of Afghans fighting in Syria on behalf of the Syrian Arab Republic has been estimated at "between 10,000 and 12,000", the number of Pakistanis is not known (approximately 15% of Pakistan's population is Shia). The main forces are the liwa' fatimiyun (Fatimiyun Brigade) – which is composed exclusively of Afghans and fights "under the auspices" of Hezbollah Afghanistan—and the Pakistani liwa' zaynabiyun (Zaynabiyun Brigade) formed in November 2015. Many or most of the fighters are refugees, and Iran has been accused of taking advantage of their inability to "obtain work permits or establish legal residency in Iran", and using threats of deportation for those who hesitate to volunteer. The fighters are also paid a relatively high salary, and some have told journalists, that "the Islamic State is a common enemy of Iran and Afghanistan ... this is a holy war," and that they wish to protect the Shia pilgrimage site of Sayyida Zaynab, from Sunni jihadis.

Russia

On 30 September 2015, Russia's Federation Council unanimously granted the request by President of Russia Vladimir Putin to permit the use of the Russian Armed Forces in Syria. On the same day, the Russian general Sergey Kurylenko, who represents Russia at the joint information center in Baghdad set up by Russia, Iran, Iraq and Syria to coordinate their operations "primarily for fighting IS (Islamic State)", arrived at the US Embassy in Baghdad and requested that any U.S. forces in the targeted area leave immediately. An hour later, the Russian aircraft based in the government-held territory began conducting airstrikes against the rebel forces.

In response to the downing of a hezbollah government Su-22 plane by a U.S. fighter jet near the town of Tabqa in Raqqa province on 18 June 2017, Russia announced that U.S.-led coalition warplanes flying west of the Euphrates would be tracked by Russian anti-aircraft forces in the sky and on the ground and treated as targets; furthermore, the Russian military said they suspended the hotline (the deconfliction line) with their U.S. counterparts based in Al Udeid. Nevertheless, a few days later, the U.S. military stated that the deconfliction line remained open and that Russia had given the U.S. a prior notification of its massive cruise missile strike from warships in the Mediterranean that was conducted on 23 June 2017, despite the fact that the U.S. was not among those countries mentioned as being forewarned in Russia's official report on the strike. On 27 June 2017, U.S. defence minister Jim Mattis told the press:

We deconflict with the Russians; it's a very active deconfliction line. It's on several levels, from the chairman of the Joint Chiefs and the secretary of state with their counterparts in Moscow, General Gerasimov and Minister Lavrov. Then we've got a three-star deconfliction line that is out of the Joints Chiefs of Staff out of the J5 there. Then we have battlefield deconfliction lines. One of them is three-star again, from our field commander in Baghdad, and one of them is from our CAOC, our Combined Air Operations Center, for real-time deconfliction.

Syrian opposition and allies

Syrian National Coalition and Interim Government

Syrian National Coalition

Formed on 23 August 2011, the National Council is a coalition of anti-government groups, based in Turkey. The National Council seeks the end of Bashar al-Assad's rule and the establishment of a modern, civil, democratic state. SNC has links with the Free Syrian Army. On 11 November 2012 in Doha, the National Council and other opposition groups united as the National Coalition for Syrian Revolutionary and Opposition Forces. The SNC has 22 out of 60 seats of the Syrian National Coalition. The following day, it was recognized as the legitimate government of Syria by numerous Persian Gulf states.

Delegates to the Coalition's leadership council are to include women and representatives of religious and ethnic minorities, including Alawites. The military council will reportedly include the Free Syrian Army. The main aims of the National Coalition are replacing the Bashar al-Assad government and "its symbols and pillars of support", "dismantling the security services", unifying and supporting the Free Syrian Army, refusing dialogue and negotiation with the al-Assad government, and "holding accountable those responsible for killing Syrians, destroying [Syria], and displacing [Syrians]."

Interim Government

In 2013, the Syrian National Coalition formed the Syrian Interim Government. The minister of defense was to be chosen by the Free Syrian Army. The interim government's headquarters in Syria are located in the city of Azaz in Aleppo Governorate. As of June 2019 its prime minister is Abdurrahman Mustafa and as of July 2021 its president is Salem al-Meslet.

Free Syrian Army and affiliate groups

The formation of the Free Syrian Army (FSA) was announced on 29 July 2011 by a group of defecting Syrian Army officers, encouraging others to defect to defend civilian protesters from violence by the state and effect government change. By December 2011, estimates of the number of defectors to the FSA ranged from 1,000 to over 25,000. The FSA, initially "headquartered" in Turkey, moved its headquarters to northern Syria in September 2012, and functions more as an umbrella organization than a traditional military chain of command.

In March 2012, two reporters of The New York Times witnessed an FSA attack and learned that the FSA had a stock of able, trained soldiers and ex-officers, organized to some extent, but without the weapons to put up a realistic fight.

In April 2013, the US announced it would transfer $123 million in nonlethal aid to Syrian rebels through defected general Salim Idriss, leader of the FSA, who later acknowledged "the rebels" were badly fragmented and lacked military skill. Idriss said he was working on a countrywide command structure, but that a lack of material support was hurting that effort. "Now it is very important for them to be unified. But unifying them in a manner to work like a regular army is still difficult", Idriss said. He acknowledged common operations with Islamist group Ahrar ash-Sham but denied any cooperation with Islamist group al-Nusra Front.

Abu Yusaf, a commander of the Islamic State (IS), said in August 2014 that many of the FSA members who had been trained by United States' and Turkish and Arab military officers were actually joining IS, but by September 2014 the Free Syrian Army was joining an alliance and common front with Kurdish militias including the YPG to fight ISIS.

In December 2015, according to the American Institute for the Study of War, groups identifying as FSA were still present around Aleppo and Hama and in southern Syria, and the FSA was still "the biggest and most secular of the rebel groups."

After the Turkish military intervention in Syria in 2016, and as other countries began to scale back their involvement, the FSA became more dependent on Turkish help. For the FSA, Turkey was a sanctuary and a source of supplies. From late August 2016, the Turkish government assembled a new coalition of Syrian rebel groups, including many that were in the FSA. The core of this new coalition was the Hawar Kilis Operations Room. Often referred to as the Turkish-backed Free Syrian Army (TFSA), this force would adopt the name Syrian National Army in 2017. By March 2017, the FSA backed by Turkey finished clearing the Islamic State from the north of Syria.

Other rebel militias
 Syrian opposition affiliated rebel groups
Islamic Front (2013–2015)
 Southern Front (2014–2018)
 Army of the South (2018)
Jaysh al-Ababil (2014–2018)
Alawiyat al-Qasioun
Alawiyat Jidor Horan
Revolutionary Army of the Jidor Area
Holding Fast Operations Room
Al-Hara Military Council
Tasil Military Council
Swords of Truth Room
Liwa Ahrar Qita
Manifest Victory Operations Room
Aligned Factions of the Eastern Region
Gathering of Revolutionaries of Mahajah (2018)
 Liwa Omar al-Mukhtar
 Liwa Muhammad ibn Abdullah
 Liwa al-Fatah
404 Lions of Golan Division (2018)
Brigades and Battalions of the Unification Army
Martyrs of Dignity Brigade
Free Men of Deir Makar Brigade
Norsur Artuz Brigade
Strangers of the Countryside Brigade
Aisha, Mother of Believers, Battalion
Neighbourhoods of Jihad Battalion
Islamic Union of the Soldiers of the Levant (2013–2018)

 Police forces

Free Syrian Police (2013–2019)

Syrian National Army

On 30 December 2017, at least 30 factions operating under the banner of the Syrian Interim Government merged in a unified armed group after four months of preparations. Jawad Abu Hatab, the Prime Minister and the Defence Minister, announced the forming of the Syrian National Army after meeting with rebel commanders in the town of Azaz. The newly formed body claimed to have 22,000 fighters, many of them trained and equipped by Turkey. Though concentrated in Turkish-occupied areas, originally as a part of Operation Euphrates Shield, the SNA also established a presence in the Idlib Governorate during the 2019 northwestern Syria offensive, and consolidated its presence when the National Front for Liberation joined the SNA on 4 October 2019.

The official aims of the group are to assist the Republic of Turkey in creating a "safe zone" in Syria, and to establish a National Army. They are strong opponents of the Syrian Democratic Forces (SDF), and have also fought the Islamic State of Iraq and the Levant (ISIL) and, to a lesser extent, the Baathist Syrian government's Syrian Arab Army. The SNA has a law enforcement equivalent, the Free Police, which is also backed by Turkey. The SNA currently controls the Afrin area, and nearby areas of Syria bordering Turkey, including the town of Jarabalus.

National Coordination Committee for Democratic Change

Formed in 2011 and based in Damascus, the National Coordination Committee for Democratic Change is an opposition bloc consisting of 13 left-wing political parties and "independent political and youth activists". It has been defined by Reuters as the internal opposition's main umbrella group. The NCC initially had several Kurdish political parties as members, but all except for the Democratic Union Party left in October 2011 to join the Kurdish National Council. Some have accused the NCC of being a "front organization" for Bashar al-Assad's government and some of its members of being ex-government insiders.

Relations with other Syrian political opposition groups are generally poor. The Syrian Revolution General Commission, the Local Coordination Committees of Syria or the Supreme Council of the Syrian Revolution oppose the NCC calls to dialogue with the Baathist government. In September 2012, the Syrian National Council (SNC) reaffirmed that despite broadening its membership, it would not join with "currents close to [the] NCC". Despite recognizing the Free Syrian Army on 23 September 2012, the FSA has dismissed the NCC as an extension of the government, stating that "this opposition is just the other face of the same coin".

Syrian Salvation Government

The Syrian Salvation Government (SSG) is an alternative government of the Syrian Opposition seated within Idlib Governorate. The General Conference, concluded on 11 September 2017, formed a constituent assembly and named a prime minister. It is seen as illegitimate by the opposition's main Syrian Interim Government. The deputy prime minister of the SSG for military affairs is Riad al-Asaad, the founder of the Free Syrian Army. HTS is the military arm of this government.

Al-Qaeda and affiliates
In September 2013, US Secretary of State John Kerry stated that Salafi-jihadist groups make up 15–25% of rebel forces. According to Charles Lister, also in September 2013, about 12% of rebels were part of groups linked to al-Qaeda (not including ISIL, which had separated from al-Qaeda six months earlier), 18% belonged to Ahrar ash-Sham, and 9% belonged to Suqour al-Sham Brigade. These numbers contrasted with a September 2013 report by Jane's Information Group, a defense outlet, claiming almost half of all rebels were affiliated with Islamist groups. British think-tank Centre on Religion and Geopolitics, linked to former British PM Tony Blair, stated in December 2015 that the proportion had grown so that 60% of the rebels could be classified as Islamic extremists, mostly Salafists. In March 2016, a report by the Institute for the Study of War calculated the ideologies of the extant Syrian opposition fighters as follows: 30% secularists, 28% Syrian Salafi jihadists, 22% Syrian political Islamists, and 20% transnational Salafi jihadists, for a total of 70% Islamists. The report clarified the categories: "the difference between Syrian jihadists and political Islamists is more or less akin to the difference between Salafists and the Muslim Brotherhood – in simplified terms, the former seek strict application of Islamic law, while many of the latter tend to favor a state with an Islamic civil constitution but protections for religious freedom. As for the "secularists," the term is used very loosely because most of the fighters in this category are conservative Muslims who do not actually want a secular government."

In September 2013, leaders of 13 powerful salafist brigades rejected the Syrian National Coalition and called Sharia law "the sole source of legislation". In a statement they declared that "the coalition and the putative government headed by Ahmad Tomeh does not represent or recognize us". Among the signatory rebel groups were al-Nusra Front, Ahrar ash-Sham and Al-Tawheed.

In a January 2020 press release, the Syrian Observatory For Human Rights released its tally of all fatalities in the Syrian Civil War up to that point, broken down by faction. The anti-government fighter fatalities totaled 134,447, of which 28% were ISIL fighters, 20% "jihadist" fighters part of or allied to Hayat Tahrir al-Sham and its predecessor the Al-Nusra Front (including affiliates such as Ahrar al-Islam, the Turkistan Islamic Party in Syria, and the Caucasus Emirate), 10% SDF/YPG fighters, 2% defectors from the Syrian Army, and 40% all other anti-government fighters.

Al-Nusra Front / Jabhat Fateh al-Sham

Prior to the expansion of ISIL, al-Qaeda's Syrian affiliate, the al-Nusra Front was often considered to be the most aggressive and violent part of the opposition. Being responsible for over 50 suicide bombings, including several deadly explosions in Damascus in 2011 and 2012, it was recognized as a terrorist organization by the Syrian Arab Republic and was designated as such by United States in December 2012. In April 2013, the leader of the Islamic State of Iraq released an audio statement announcing that al-Nusra Front is its branch in Syria. The leader of al-Nusra, Abu Mohammad al-Golani, said that the group would not merge with the Islamic State of Iraq but would still maintain allegiance to Ayman al-Zawahiri, the leader of al-Qaeda. From 2012 to 2016, the estimated manpower of al-Nusra Front was approximately 6,000–10,000 people, including many foreign fighters.

The relationship between the al-Nusra Front and the indigenous Syrian opposition was tense, even though al-Nusra has fought alongside the FSA in several battles and some FSA fighters defected to the al-Nusra Front. The Mujahideen's strict religious views and willingness to impose sharia law disturbed many Syrians. Some rebel commanders have accused foreign jihadists of "stealing the revolution", robbing Syrian factories and displaying religious intolerance.

The al-Nusra Front renamed itself Jabhat Fateh al-Sham (JFS) in June 2016, and later joined with three other Salafi factions, Ansar al-Din Front, Jaysh al-Sunna, the Nour al-Din al-Zenki Movement (once supported by the US) and Liwa al-Haqq, to become the leading member of Hay'at Tahrir al-Sham (HTS) in 2017, in which they were joined by defectors from Ahrar al-Sham. (The Ansar al-Din Front and Nour al-Din al-Zenki Movement have since split off). HTS had an estimated 20,000 members in 2019. Tahrir al-Sham has denied being part of al-Qaeda and said in a statement that the group is "an independent entity and not an extension of previous organizations or factions".

Hurras al-Din (2018-Present)

Tanzim Hurras al-Din (transliteration: , Guardians of Religion Organization or Guardians of Religion) commonly referred to as Hurras al-Din, is an armed insurgent group affiliated with Al-Qaeda and fighting in the Syrian Civil War. Hurras al-Din was formed as a merger between seven Al-Qaeda aligned factions on 28 February 2018. The head of the group, Abu Humam al-Shami, was a Syrian who fought with Al-Qaeda in Afghanistan during the 1990s and previously the al-Nusra Front, al-Qaeda's branch in Syria between 2013 and 2016.

Islamic State of Iraq and the Levant (ISIL)

Called Dā'ash or the Islamic State of Iraq and the Levant, (abbrv. ISIL or ISIS [Islamic State of Iraq and Syria]) it made rapid military gains in Northern Syria starting in April 2013 and as of mid-2014 controlled large parts of that region, where the Syrian Observatory for Human Rights described it as "the strongest group". It has imposed strict Sharia law over land that it controls. The group was, until 2014, affiliated with al-Qaeda, led by the Iraqi fighter Abu Bakr al-Baghdadi, and had an estimated 7,000 fighters in Syria, including many non-Syrians, by the end of 2013. It has been praised as less corrupt than other militia groups and criticized for abusing human rights and for not tolerating non-Islamist militia groups, foreign journalists or aid workers, whose members it has expelled, imprisoned, or executed. According to Michael Weiss, ISIL has not been targeted by the Baathist government "with quite the same gusto" as other rebel factions.

By summer 2014, ISIL controlled a third of Syria. It established itself as the dominant force of Syrian opposition, defeating Jabhat al-Nusra in Deir Ezzor Governorate and claiming control over most of Syria's oil and gas production.

The Ba'athist government did not begin to fight ISIL until June 2014 despite its having a presence in Syria since April 2013, according to Kurdish officials. According to IHS Markit, between April 2016 and April 2017, ISIL offensively fought the Baathist government 43% of times, Turkish-backed rebel groups 40% of times, and the Syrian Democratic Forces 17% of times.

ISIL was able to recruit more than 6,300 fighters in July 2014 alone. ISIL have planted bombs in the ancient city area of Palmyra, a city with population of 50,000. Palmyra is counted as a UNESCO World Heritage Site as it is home to some of the most extensive and best-preserved ancient Roman ruins in the world. Having lost nearly half of their territory in Iraq between 2014 and 2016, some Islamic State leaders in Iraq moved into Syria, further destabilizing the region.

From 2014, an international coalition of states intervened against ISIL. The US-led Operation Inherent Resolve started in October 2014. As of December 2017, Russia declared ISIL to be totally defeated within Syria. At the end of 2018, the US declared it defeated, although its UK and German allies disagreed. On 23 March 2019 the US-backed Syrian Democratic Forces declared ISIS Defeated, after seizing their last Enclave of territory. In October 2019, the US assassinated IS leader al-Baghdadi. ISIL named Abu Ibrahim al Hashimi al-Qurayshi as Baghdadi's successor. As of 2022, ISIL continue to be active militarily in Northeast Syria.

AANES

Syrian Democratic Council

The Syrian Democratic Council was established on 10 December 2015 in al-Malikiyah. It was co-founded by prominent human rights activist Haytham Manna and was intended as the political wing of the Syrian Democratic Forces. The council includes more than a dozen blocs and coalitions that support federalism in Syria, including the Movement for a Democratic Society, the Kurdish National Alliance in Syria, the Law–Citizenship–Rights Movement, and since September 2016, the Syria's Tomorrow Movement. The last group is led by former National Coalition president and Syrian National Council Ahmad Jarba. In August 2016 the SDC opened a public office in al-Hasakah.

The Syrian Democratic Council was excluded from the international Geneva III peace talks on Syria in March 2016, as well as other talks since, because of opposition from the Turkish state.

Syrian Democratic Forces

The Syrian Democratic Forces (SDF) are an alliance of mainly Kurdish but also Arab, Syriac-Assyrian, and Turkmen militias with mainly left-wing and democratic confederalist political leanings. They are opposed to the Assad government, but have directed most of their efforts against Al-Nusra Front and ISIL.

The group formed in December 2015, led primarily by the predominantly Kurdish People's Protection Units (YPG). Estimates of its size range from 55,000 to 80,000 fighters. While largely Kurdish, it is estimated that about 40% of the fighters are non-Kurdish. Kurds – mostly Sunni Muslims, with a small minority of Yezidis – represented 10% of Syria's population at the start of the uprising in 2011. They had suffered from decades of discrimination and neglect, being deprived of basic civil, cultural, economic, and social rights. When protests began, Assad's government finally granted citizenship to an estimated 200,000 stateless Kurds, in an effort to try and neutralize potential Kurdish opposition. Despite this concession, most Kurds remain opposed to the government, hoping instead for a more decentralized Syria based on federalism. The Syriac Military Council, like many Syriac-Assyrian militias (such as Khabour Guards, Nattoreh, and Sutoro), originally formed to defend Assyrian villages, but joined the Kurdish forces to retake Hasakah from ISIS in late 2015 The Female Protection Forces of the Land Between the Two Rivers is an all-female force of Assyrian fighters in north east Syria fighting ISIS alongside other Assyrian and Kurdish units. Before the formation of the SDF, the YPG was the primary fighting force in the DFNS, and first entered this Syrian civil war as belligerent in July 2012 by capturing a town, Kobanî, that until then was under control of the Syrian Assad-government (see Syrian Kurdistan campaign).

On 17 March 2016 the Syrian Democratic Council, the political wing of the SDF, declared the creation of an autonomous federation in northern Syria.

Foreign involvement

Both the Syrian Arab Republic and the Syria opposition have received support, militarily and diplomatically, from foreign countries leading the conflict to often be described as a proxy war. The major parties supporting the Assad government are Russia, Iran and Hezbollah. The main Syrian opposition body – the Syrian coalition – receives political, logistic and military support from the United States, Britain and France.

The pro-government countries are involved in the war politically and logistically by providing military equipment, training and battle troops. Baathist Syria has also received arms from Russia and SIGINT support directly from GRU, in addition to significant political support from Russia.

Some Syrian rebels get training from the CIA at bases in Qatar, Jordan and Saudi Arabia. Under the aegis of operation Timber Sycamore and other clandestine activities, CIA operatives and U.S. special operations troops have trained and armed nearly 10,000 rebel fighters at a cost of $1 billion a year since 2012. The Syrian coalition also receives logistic and political support from Sunni states, most notably Turkey, Qatar and Saudi Arabia; all the three major supporting states however have not contributed any troops for direct involvement in the war, though Turkey was involved in border incidents with the Syrian Army. The Financial Times and The Independent reported that Qatar had funded the Syrian rebellion by as much as $3 billion. Some Syrian rebel groups were supported by the Netherlands.  According to Seymour Hersh, US intelligence estimates that the opposition is financed by Saudi Arabia to the tune of $700 million a year (2014). The designation of the FSA by the West as a moderate opposition faction has allowed it, under the CIA-run programmes, to receive sophisticated weaponry and other military support from the U.S., Turkey and some Gulf countries. , Qatar, Saudi Arabia and Turkey are openly backing the Army of Conquest, an umbrella rebel group that reportedly includes an al-Qaeda linked al-Nusra Front and another Salafi coalition known as Ahrar ash-Sham, and Faylaq Al-Sham, a coalition of Muslim Brotherhood-linked rebel groups.

In 2014, French television France 24 reported that the Islamic State in Iraq and the Levant, with perhaps 3,000 foreign jihadists among its ranks, "receives private donations from the Gulf states." It is estimated ISIL has sold oil for $1M–4M per day principally to Turkish buyers, during at least six months in 2013, greatly helping its growth. The Turkish government has been also accused of helping ISIL by turning a blind eye to illegal transfers of weapons, fighters, oil and pillaged antiquities across the southern border.

On 21 August 2014, two days after US photojournalist James Foley was beheaded, the U.S. military admitted a covert rescue attempt involving dozens of US Special Operations forces had been made to rescue Americans and other foreigners held captive in Syria by ISIL militants. The rescue attempt was the first known US military ground action inside Syria. On 11 September 2014 the US Congress expressed support to give President Obama the $500 million he wanted to arm and train moderate Syrian rebels. The US also began airstrikes against ISIL in 2014.

Foreign fighters have joined the conflict in opposition to Assad. In December 2015, the Soufan Group estimated a total of 27,000–31,000 foreign fighters from 86 countries had travelled to Syria and Iraq to join extremist groups. While most foreign fighters are jihadists, some individuals, such as Mahdi al-Harati, have joined to support the Syrian opposition. In 2013, the ICSR estimated that 2,000–5,500 foreign fighters had gone to Syria since the beginning of the protests, about 7–11 percent of whom came from Europe. It also estimated that the number of foreign fighters did not exceed 10 percent of the opposition armed forces. Another estimate puts the number of foreign jihadis at 15,000 by early 2014.

Thousands of Shia foreign fighters are in Syria from Iraq, Lebanon, Iran, Pakistan, Afghanistan, and Bahrain, with Shia militias. They fight on behalf of the Assad government, which is dominated by minority Alawites. The largest groups are Liwa Fatemiyoun and Hezbollah.

The European and North American far right is generally supportive of the Assad government in Syria, and far right foreign fighters, e.g. from the Balkans and Scandinavia, are found in pro-government militias. Hundreds of leftists have become foreign fighters in the Syrian Democratic Forces, with most joining the International Freedom Battalion of the People's Protection Units (YPG), out of a mixture of opposition to the Islamic State and willingness to defend the Autonomous Administration of North and East Syria (AANES).

There are several private military companies operating in Syria, such as the Wagner Group and the Slavonic Corps.

U.S.-led coalition against ISIL

A number of countries, including some individual NATO members, have since September 2014 participated in air operations in Syria that came to be overseen by the Combined Joint Task Force, set up by the US Central Command to coordinate military efforts against ISIL pursuant to their collectively undertaken commitments, including those of 3 December 2014. Those who have conducted airstrikes in Syria include the United States, Australia, Bahrain, Canada, France, Jordan, Netherlands, Saudi Arabia, Turkey, the United Arab Emirates, and the United Kingdom. Some members are involved in the conflict beyond combating ISIL; Turkey has been accused of fighting against Kurdish forces in Syria and Iraq, including intelligence collaborations with ISIL in some cases.

President Trump, declaring "we have won against ISIS," abruptly announced on 19 December 2018 that the remaining 2,000 American troops in Syria would be withdrawn. Trump made the announcement on Twitter, overruling the recommendations of his military commanders and civilian advisors, with apparently no prior consultation with Congress. Although no timetable was provided, press secretary Sarah Sanders indicated that the withdrawal had begun. After Trump's announcement, the Pentagon and State Department tried to change his mind, with several of his congressional and political allies expressing serious concerns about the sudden move, specifically that it would hand control of the region to Russia and Iran, and abandon America's Kurdish allies. The following day, the SDF said that a US pullout would allow ISIL to recover and warned of a military vacuum that would leave the alliance trapped between "hostile parties". The UK, France, Germany all considered the fight against ISIL ongoing.

Israel

Israel's official position on the Syrian Civil War has been strict neutrality. On the other hand, Israel has become involved politically and militarily to prevent the growing influence and entrenchment of Iranian forces and its proxies throughout Syria. Israel's military activity, officially called Operation Chess, has primarily been limited to missile and air strikes targeting Iranian facilities in Syria as well as those of its proxies, especially Hezbollah. These attacks were not officially acknowledged before 2017. Israel has also carried out air strikes in Syria to disrupt weapons shipments to Hezbollah.

Opposing forces

Notes 

The United States alleged that Belarus and Cuba has provided or attempted to provide direct military support to the Syrian government. Both countries have denied this. There are also unconfirmed reports that Algeria is providing military support to the Syrian government.
There is regular conflict between the different rebel groups in the inter-rebel conflict during the Syrian Civil War.
Jund al-Aqsa was allied with al-Nusra Front and other rebels as part of the Army of Conquest, which the group left in October 2015 and subsequently was accused of being allied with ISIL, taking part in ISIL-led offensives such as the 2016 Khanasir offensive. However, Jund al-Aqsa again worked with the Army of Conquest and other rebels during the 2016 Southern Aleppo campaign. Eventually most of Jund al-Aqsa joined al-Nusra. Conflict between the two broke out in 2017.
The Kurdish National Council has joined the Syrian National Coalition—though without officially committing any military forces to the opposition—while simultaneously retaining its membership in the Kurdish Supreme Committee, alongside the PYD.
Canada withdrew jet fighters from the US-led coalition against ISIL on 15 February 2016.
The Syriac Military Council (including Bethnahrain Women's Protection Forces), Sutoro, Ashur Forces (Khabour Guards and Nattoreh) all represent the Assyrian people of Syria.
Turkey is part of the CJTF–OIR against ISIL, but is also fighting against the SDF, which is supported by CJTF–OIR.
Russia provides air support to the Syrian Ba'athist government. Previously, it also provided air support to Turkey and the Syrian Democratic Forces against ISIL and some Syrian rebel groups, respectively, but not against one another.
Serbia, a traditional Orthodox ally of Russia who supports the Assad government, has assisted Russian troops in humanitarian missions on multiple occasions.
Armenia, Egypt, Venezuela, Algeria, and China send non-lethal support to the Syrian Government. 
Israel has been neutral throughout the war, but has engaged with Iran as part of the Iran–Israel proxy conflict.

See also

Combatants of the Iraq War
Foreign involvement in the Syrian civil war
Foreign fighters in the Syrian Civil War and War in Iraq
List of armed groups in the War in Iraq (2013–2017)
List of armed groups in the Second Libyan Civil War
List of armed groups in the Yemeni Civil War
List of armed groups in the Syrian civil war spillover in Lebanon
Spillover of the Syrian civil war

Notes

References

External links
Syrian Civil War factions
Syrian Civil War factions by Bellingcat

 
Armed groups